Parodia crassigibba, the green tomato cactus, is a species of cactus in the genus Parodia, native to Rio Grande do Sul state in southern Brazil. It has gained the Royal Horticultural Society's Award of Garden Merit as a houseplant.

References

crassigibba
Endemic flora of Brazil
Flora of South Brazil
Plants described in 1987